Michael or Mike Wilkinson may refer to:

 Michael Wilkinson (costume designer), Oscar-nominated costume designer
 Michael Wilkinson (rower) (born 1986), Canadian Olympic rower
 Mike Wilkinson (basketball) (born 1981), American basketball player
 Mike Wilkinson (fighter) (born 1987), English mixed martial artist